The 1982 Busan arson attack or Busan American Council Fire Accidents (Hangeul: 부산 미국문화원 방화사건, Hanja: 釜山美國文化院放火事件) was an anti-American attack against the United States Information Service building in Busan on 18 March 1982. The attack resulted in the death of a Dong-a University student who was studying in the building; three others were injured.

Aftermath
In June 1982, 16 people were put on trial in Busan for involvement in the attack. Theology student Moon Pu-shik (23) admitted the arson charge, saying the fire was a protest against US support for the Chun Doo-hwan dictatorship, particularly the suppression of the Gwangju Uprising. The other defendants included journalist Kim Hyong-jang (32) and Reverend Choi Ki-shik (39) head of the Catholic education center in Wonju, who was accused of sheltering the attackers. In August 1982 Kim Hyong-jang and Moon Pu-shik were sentenced to death for the arson, while Moon's wife Kim Un-suk (24) and Lee Mi-ok (21), were sentenced to life imprisonment. Following pleas for mercy from the US and protests by Catholic and Protestant groups, Kim and Moon's death sentences were commuted to life imprisonment in March 1983. Their sentences were reduced to 20 years in 1988. Moon Pu-shik was released from prison in 1988 after having served six years and nine months in prison.

The former USIS building now houses the Busan Modern History Museum.

See also 
 Gwangju massacre
 Yangju highway incident
 Anti-American sentiment in Korea
 Anti-Americanism

References

External links 
 민주화운동의 요람, 가톨릭과 기독교 김주완  	2007년 07월 12일
US Council Fire (Korean) 
Busan American Council Fire Accidents

Arson in South Korea
Anti-Americanism 
Left-wing nationalism in South Korea
South Korea–United States relations
Political history of South Korea
1982 in South Korea
1982 crimes in South Korea
History of Busan
1982 fires in Asia
1982 disasters in South Korea